Igor Carreira Rodrigues (born 5 May 1995) is a Portuguese professional footballer who plays as a goalkeeper for Feirense.

Club career
Born in Leiria, Rodrigues made his professional debut with Sporting da Covilhã in a 2016–17 Taça da Liga match against Aves on 31 July 2016.

References

External links

Stats and profile at LPFP 

1995 births
Living people
People from Leiria
Portuguese footballers
Association football goalkeepers
F.C. Oliveira do Hospital players
S.C. Covilhã players
S.L. Benfica footballers
G.D. Estoril Praia players
G.D. Chaves players
C.D. Feirense players
Liga Portugal 2 players
Campeonato de Portugal (league) players
Sportspeople from Leiria District